= Vincent Kolo =

Nigerian artist

Vincent OKolo is a Nigerian artist

Kolo won the first Nefertiti Grand Prize for his artwork 'Cords of Yesterday' to commemorate Africa Integration Day. According to the African Union-backed organizers, the category was for works that captured "...the contemporary quest for Africa to learn from its past, take charge of its present and build its own unique vision of a united, prosperous, future". His submission depicted an African woman with her hands tied adjacent to her face through the aid of a rope.
